The Eskişehir-Afyon Regional, numbered as B73, is a daily regional passenger train operating between Eskişehir and Afyon. The train serves as a connecting train for high-speed YHT trains, serving Eskişehir, to Kütahya and Afyon. Operated by TCDD Taşımacılık, one daily train in each direction makes the  journey.

Service began on 17 May 2010, one year after the opening of the Ankara-Eskişehir high-speed railway. The northbound train departs Afyon in the morning, while the southbound train departs Eskişehir in the evening.

References

External links
Train timetable
TCDD Regional Trains

Railway services introduced in 2010
Transport in Eskişehir Province
Transport in Kütahya Province
Regional rail in Turkey
Transport in Afyonkarahisar Province
2010 establishments in Turkey